The Guldbagge for Best Actress in a Supporting Role is a Swedish film award presented annually by the Swedish Film Institute (SFI) as part of the Guldbagge Awards (Swedish: "Guldbaggen") to actresses working in the Swedish motion picture industry.

The categories for Best Supporting Actress and Supporting Actor were first introduced in 1995. In 1992, Ernst Günther received a Guldbagge for Creative Efforts, for his supporting role as Gottfrid in House of Angels.

Winners and nominees 
Each Guldbagge Awards ceremony is listed chronologically below along with the winner of the Guldbagge Award for Actress in a Supporting Role and the film associated with the award. In the columns under the winner of each award are the other nominees for best supporting actress.

Notes and references

See also 
 Academy Award for Best Supporting Actress
 BAFTA Award for Best Actress in a Supporting Role
 Golden Globe Award for Best Supporting Actress – Motion Picture
 Broadcast Film Critics Association Award for Best Supporting Actress
 Screen Actors Guild Award for Outstanding Performance by a Female Actor in a Supporting Role

External links 
  
  
 

Supporting actress
Film awards for supporting actress
 
Supporting actress